Greg Devorski (born August 3, 1969 in Guelph, Ontario) is a National Hockey League linesman since the 1993–94 NHL season, who wears uniform number 54 since the 1994–95 NHL season.  He is the younger brother of former NHL referee Paul Devorski. Devorski was rewarded with assignments to four Stanley Cup Finals. Devorski has worked 1,755 regular season games along with 212 playoff appearances.

Devorski was also selected as a linesman for the 2014 Winter Olympics.

References

1969 births
Living people
National Hockey League officials
Ice hockey people from Ontario
Sportspeople from Guelph